Blue Eagle(s) may refer to:

 Blue Eagle (National Recovery Administration), a symbol used to show compliance with the U.S. National Industrial Recovery Act of 1933
 The Blue Eagle at Work, a legal treatise which analyzes collective bargaining under the National Labor Relations Act of 1935
 Blue Eagles, British Army Air Corps helicopter aerobatic team
 Blue Eagle (comics), a Marvel Comics character
 Blue Eagle, Minnesota, a former settlement in Minnesota, United States
 The Blue Eagle, a 1926 film directed by John Ford
 Ateneo Blue Eagles, sports teams of Ateneo de Manila University
 Adelaide Blue Eagles, soccer club in Australia
 Blue Eagles FC, football club in Malawi
 Acee Blue Eagle (1907-1959), American artist
 MV Blue Eagle, a Singaporean coaster ship
 Chilean blue eagle, alias black-chested buzzard-eagle, Geranoaetus melanoleucus

See also 
 Blue Mountain Eagle (disambiguation)